Jiang Yuyuan (also Yuyan; ; born November 1, 1991 in Liuzhou, Guangxi) is a retired Chinese gymnast. She is the 2008 Chinese all-around senior National Champion and a member of the gold medal-winning People's Republic of China team for the 2008 Summer Olympics. Jiang was a member of the silver medal-winning Chinese team at the 2007 World Championships, the bronze medal-winning member at the 2010 World Championships and 2011 World Championships, and the all-around gold medalist at the 2007 Good Luck Beijing Olympic test event. In 2010, she replaced Cheng Fei as the captain of the Chinese national team (due to Fei's leg injury). She won a silver medal in the all-around competition at the 2010 World Championships, which is the highest position that a Chinese woman has ever placed in the all-around competition at a world or Olympic championship.

Personal life
Jiang Yuyuan is a Hakka born in Liuzhou, Guangxi with ancestry from Yunan, Guangdong. Her father is a taxi driver and her mother is unemployed with no regular income. Jiang's family was under a lot of financial pressure when she was little.
Jiang has a keen interest in photography, digital gadgets, cars, fashion and cosmetics. She also likes listening to English songs.  Team members Cheng Fei and Yang Yilin single out Jiang as the most beauty-conscious and trendy member in the national women team. Jiang is responsible for teaching other female members of the national team about make-up technique. Jiang said in one of her interviews that she is sometimes "a little bit of a rebel". Her Headcoach in Chinese national team, Lu Shanzhen, agreed that she would become rebellious occasionally and said that Jiang has the "most character" among the female gymnasts in the national team. Jiang's idol is her fellow gymnast, Cheng Fei.

Jiang and her teammate, Deng Linlin, appeared in the official Olympics documentary 筑梦2008 (Dream Weavers 2008) which followed the gymnasts from 2003 until Jiang's international debut at the 2007 World Championships.

Gymnastics career
Li Ning's cousin was Jiang's neighbour when she was little. After noticing that the little Jiang was very energetic for a kid, he suggested to Jiang's parents that they sign her up for gymnastics lessons. Her parents took his suggestion and so Jiang was enrolled in gymnastics classes by the time she was four. She was once selected by the Guangxi Provincial Team to participate in a three-month training camp but her parents received a call from the Provincial Team asking them to bring Jiang home less than two months after the training began. Her coach at that time insisted that Jiang had talent and persuaded Jiang's parents to leave Jiang under her care and she would train Jiang personally. But it would be a dead end for a gymnast's career in China if one could not join the Provincial Team, so when opportunity came, Jiang was transferred from Guangxi to join the Zhejiang Provincial Team.

Jiang captured glory in the 2002 Provincial Gymnastics Championships for the Zhejiang Provincial Team by winning the all-around competition and, in so doing, caught the attention of the National Team coaches. Soon thereafter, in 2003, she joined the National Training Camp for a stint before it was forced to disband due to the outbreak of the disease, SARS. Jiang joined the National Team 2 in 2004, and was selected from a list of 300 hopefuls of Team 2 to join the National Team 1 in 2006.

She made her senior international debut in 2007 as a member of the Chinese team that won the silver medal in the team competition at the 2007 World Gymnastics Championships. At the same competition, she placed 4th on floor exercise in the individual event finals. In November 2007, she won the all-around at the Good Luck Beijing Olympic Test Event.

At the 2008 Beijing Olympics, Jiang helped the Chinese team to win the team gold medal at the Olympics. Individually, she finished in 6th place in the all-around competition and finished 4th place in the floor exercise event final. Jiang competed at the Olympics with an elbow injury, specifically periosteum inflammation. Her coach disclosed that the injury greatly affected her performance at the Olympics, particularly on vault, where pain prevented her from successfully executing her 2.5-twisting Yurchenko (Amanar), which was crucial for her success in the individual all-around final. As a result of the injury, Chinese coach Lu Shanzhen also decided to pull Jiang from the vault rotation in the team finals, replacing her with Deng Linlin 20 minutes before the competition began.

In 2009, she participated in the 2009 Summer Universiade. She won a team gold medal with her teammates, Cheng Fei, He Ning, Zhou Zhuoru and Liu Nanxi. Individually, she won two gold medals in the all-around competition and on balance beam, a silver on floor exercise and a bronze on uneven bars.

In 2010, Jiang was selected to compete for the team of women representing China at the 2010 World Championships. The team qualified second into the team final, while Jiang herself qualified 4th into the all-around final along with teammate Huang Qiushuang. She also placed 5th on uneven bars, but did not advance into the final due to the 'two per country rule' while her teammates He Kexin and Huang Qiushuang qualified first and second. In the team final, Jiang participated in all four events. Despite falls and mistakes made by Jiang and her teammates, the Chinese women team managed to secure a bronze medal, following Russia and the United States. In the all-around final, Jiang finished 2nd behind Russia's Aliya Mustafina, with a total score of 59.998. Jiang also competed in the Toyota cup winning gold on uneven bars 15.425 and bronze on floor, 14.175 behind Aliya Mustafina and Sui Lu who tied for gold.

On March 24, 2011 Jiang is set to compete in Canada's Wild Rose Cup along with newcomers and juniors Huang Huidan and Shang Chunsong.

She was selected as an alternate for the 2012 Summer Olympics in London.

Jiang has served as the captain of the Chinese team since 2010. At the National Training Center, her responsibilities include looking after younger gymnasts at the dormitory.

2008 age controversy

In early 2008, fellow Chinese gymnast Yang Yun, admitted on national television that she was 14 years old when she competed in the 2000 Sydney Olympic Games. Consequently, there was frequent speculation that members of the Chinese women's gymnastics team were 14 years of age or under, violating the minimum age requirements of Fédération Internationale de Gymnastique (FIG), the governing body of the sport, that requires gymnasts to be 16.

The New York Times claimed that official media and some official Web sites in China, including that of the State General Administration of Sport, listed Chinese gymnasts' details which indicated that Jiang, He Kexin and Yang Yilin may have been as young as 14. During the Olympics, media focused their attention on Jiang, He, Yang and Deng. In response, Chinese officials claimed the discrepancies for He Kexin were caused by paperwork errors when the gymnast switched teams. Chinese authorities presented passport information to show that they were 16 years old as of 2008. Chinese coach Lu Shanzhen explained that Chinese competitors had for years all been small. "It is not just this time. It is a question of race. European and American athletes are all powerful, very robust. But Chinese athletes... are by nature that small." Sportswriter E.M. Swift criticized the IOC for "spend[ing] millions of dollars trying to ferret out drug cheats [while ignoring] allegations of institutionalized cheating" by the Chinese government.

On 22 August 2008 the International Olympic Committee (IOC) instructed the FIG to investigate the allegations that He Kexin was under-age, and were asked to report back to the IOC later that day.  The FIG accepted passport ages as valid proof and declared gymnasts eligible. On 23 August, further pressure led the FIG to request additional documentation on five of the six athletes on the Chinese team.  IOC president Jacques Rogge said that FIG had demanded "birth certificates and all the documents like family books, entries in schools and things like that." While the FIG investigation was in progress, the IOC indicated reshuffling of the medals was unlikely. Having been satisfied with the proof of age received from the Chinese Gymnastics Association, the FIG ended the investigation on 1 October 2008, concluding that He and her teammates were eligible to compete.

Skills
Vault: 
Amanar: 2.5-twisting Yurchenko (A Score: 6.5) (2008)
DTY: Double-twisting Yurchenko (A Score: 5.8) (2009-2012)

Competitive highlights

References

External links
 

1991 births
Living people
Chinese female artistic gymnasts
Gymnasts at the 2008 Summer Olympics
Olympic gold medalists for China
Olympic gymnasts of China
People from Liuzhou
Medalists at the World Artistic Gymnastics Championships
Olympic medalists in gymnastics
Gymnasts from Guangxi
Medalists at the 2008 Summer Olympics
Asian Games medalists in gymnastics
Gymnasts at the 2010 Asian Games
Asian Games gold medalists for China
Medalists at the 2010 Asian Games
Universiade medalists in gymnastics
Universiade gold medalists for China
Universiade silver medalists for China
Medalists at the 2009 Summer Universiade
21st-century Chinese women